The Dow Jones Sustainability Indices (DJSI) launched in 1999, are a family of indices evaluating the sustainability performance of thousands of companies trading publicly, operated under a strategic partnership between S&P Dow Jones Indices and RobecoSAM (Sustainable Asset Management) of the S&P Dow Jones Indices. They are the longest-running global sustainability benchmarks worldwide and have become the key reference point in sustainability investing for investors and companies alike. In 2012, S&P Dow Jones Indices was formed via the merger of S&P Indices and Dow Jones Indexes.

The DJSI is based on an analysis of corporate economic, environmental and social performance, assessing issues such as corporate governance, risk management, branding, climate change mitigation, supply chain standards and labor practices. The trend is to reject companies that do not operate in a sustainable and ethical manner. It includes general as well as industry-specific sustainability criteria for each of the 60 industries defined according to the Industry Classification Benchmark (ICB).

The DJSI family contains one main global index, the DJSI World, and various indexes based on geographic regions such as: Europe, Nordic, North America and Asia Pacific. The DJSI also contains industry-specific indexes called "blue chip indexes". In addition, the DJSI methodology facilitates the design, development and delivery of customized sustainability indexes; e.g., indexes covering different regions, indexes covering different segments of the leading sustainability companies, indexes covering additional exclusion criteria and indexes denominated in different currencies.

To be incorporated in the DJSI, companies are assessed and selected based on their long-term economic, social and environmental asset management plans. Selection criteria evolve each year and companies must continue to make improvements to their long-term sustainability plans in order to remain on the Index. Indexes are updated yearly and companies are monitored throughout the year.

History

 1999: The DJSI are launched in September. It is a collaboration with SAM and the Dow Jones Indexes. SAM is a global investment company focused exclusively on sustainability investing. The indexes are created to track financial success of leading sustainability companies. The top-ten percent of the best scoring companies of the largest 2,500 companies listed on Dow Jones are included.
 2001: The DJSI is expanded to include STOXX Ltd., another indexing company. The Dow Jones STOXX Sustainability Index is introduced and marketed towards Europe's sustainability leaders.
 2005: The Dow Jones Sustainability North America Index is created.
 2006: Dow Jones Indexes and SAM launch the Dow Jones Islamic Market Sustainability Index that combines Islamic investing principles and sustainability criteria from the DJSI.
2009: The Dow Jones Sustainability Asia Pacific Index and Korea Index are launched.
2010: SAM and Dow Jones Indexes terminate collaboration with STOXX.  "Dow Jones Indexes will be responsible for calculation, marketing and distribution of the indexes including the European Indexes, while SAM [will] remain responsible for the component selections. As a result, SAM's collaboration with STOXX Ltd., which had previously calculated the European STOXX Sustainability Indexes, has been terminated."
2010: SAM and Dow Jones Indexes launch the DJSI Nordic Index.
2012: The S&P Indices and Dow Jones Indexes are merged to form the S&P Dow Jones Indices.

Indexes
Indexes are denominated in both US dollars and Euros and are calculated using the Laspeyres formula. All indexes that are not subsets include companies that generate revenue from alcohol, tobacco, gambling, armaments and firearms, and adult entertainment. Index components are based on free-float market capitalization and most main indexes are reviewed quarterly, excluding the world index. Customized indexes are continuously being developed and delivered to encompass different regions or individualized sections of companies to add additional exclusions when needed and to change the currencies they are denoted in.

The DJSI have been divided into various benchmarks including the World, Europe, North America, Asia Pacific, Nordic, and Korean indexes.

DJSI World Index
The World Index, or DJSI World, was first published in September 1999. It is based on the largest 2,500 companies in the Dow Jones Global Total Stock Market Index (DJGTSMI). It covers the top-ten percent of these companies in terms of economic, environmental, and social criteria which equals about 300 companies. The DJSI World has two subset indexes, which are the Dow Jones Sustainability Index World 80 (DJSI World 80) and the Dow Jones Sustainability Index World ex US 80 (DJSI World ex US 80). Both subsets were initially published in August 2008 and track the performance of the largest 80 companies globally in terms of sustainability, with the DJSI World ex US 80 excluding the US from the top 80. The DJSI World and its subset are all reviewed on an annual basis.

DJSI Europe and Eurozone Index
The Dow Jones Sustainability Europe Index covers the leading 20 percent of the largest 600 European companies in terms of sustainability from the DJGTSMI. It is subset by three different more specific indexes for the region, the main subset being the Dow Jones Sustainability Eurozone Index (DJSI Eurozone). This index tracks the financial performance of sustainability leaders in the smaller eurozone region. Both indexes were launched in August 2010 and have their own further subset. The two subsets are the Dow Jones Sustainability Europe 40 Index (DJSI Europe 40) and the Dow Jones Sustainability Eurozone 40 Index (DJSI Eurozone 40), both of which were also launched in August 2010. These track the top-40 sustainability leaders in Europe and the smaller Eurozone region. DJSI Europe and eurozone are reviewed annually as well as quarterly to maintain accuracy of the index composition while the DJSI Europe 40 and DJSI Eurozone 40 are reviewed only annually.

DJSI North America and United States Index
The Dow Jones Sustainability North American Index has a similar design as the DJSI Europe and also reviews the top-20 percent of the 600 largest companies, but in this case in North America. It was originally launched, along with its subset Dow Jones Sustainability United States Index (DJSI United States), in September 2005.  Both indexes are further broken down by the Dow Jones Sustainability North America 40 Index (DJSI North America 40) and the Dow Jones Sustainability United States 40 Index (DJSI United States 40), which cover the leading 40 sustainability driven companies in North America and the United States, respectively. Both subsets, however, were not launched until August 2008, three years after the DJSI North America.

DJSI Asia Pacific Index
The Dow Jones Sustainability Asian Pacific Index (DJSI Asia Pacific) was launched at the same time as its single subset, the Dow Jones Sustainability Asia Pacific 40 Index (DJSI Asia Pacific 40), in January 2009.  As of 2009, the DJSI Asia Pacific included 122 companies and captures the leading 20 percent of the top-600 companies in developed Asia Pacific Markets in terms of sustainability as derived from the DJGTSMI. DJSI Asia Pacific 40, the subset, tracks the largest 40 companies who are sustainability leaders in the Asia Pacific region.

DJSI Korea Index
The Dow Jones Sustainability Korea Index (DJSI Korea) is derived from the smallest pool of companies, tracking the most sustainable 30 percent of the largest 200 Korean companies.  The DJSI Korea was launched in October 2009, along with its subset the Dow Jones Sustainability Korea 20 Index (DJSI Korea 20). As of that date, 41 companies were included in the DJSI Korea. DJSI Korea 20 encompasses the largest 20 sustainable leading companies in the region. The index encompasses a smaller region than the other indexes resulting in a higher percentage of companies analyzed and a lower number of companies that are reviewed in the subset. The DJSI Korea is also reviewed on an annual and quarterly basis, whereas the DJSI Korea 20 is reviewed annually.

Assessment
A defined set of criteria is used to assess the economic, social, and environmental opportunities of the companies that the DJSI has listed, which are chosen based on the Corporate Sustainability Assessment by RobecoSAM. Information comes from the annual RobecoSAM questionnaire (the Corporate Sustainability Assessment), company documentation, the Media and Stakeholder Analysis (an examination of media coverage, stakeholder commentaries and other publicly available sources provided by RepRisk ESG Business Intelligence), and personal contact with the companies. Industry leaders from RobecoSAM Research's Corporate Sustainability Assessment are chosen to be listed on the DJSI.

Once a company is listed on the DJSI, it is monitored daily for any critical arising issues, which can lead to the exclusion of the company if deemed critical enough. Examples of events that would lead to exclusion include: commercial practices, human rights abuses, layoffs or worker disputes, or catastrophic disasters. This monitoring is supported by RepRisk, a global research firm and provider of environmental, social and governance (ESG) risk data. RepRisk screens media outlets, stakeholder groups and other publicly available sources to identify risks related to these issues. The information gathered is then systematically analyzed and quantified. If a critical event happens, the situation is analyzed by RobecoSAM for the scope in which it reaches. If large enough, the event will be analyzed further based on severity, media coverage, and crisis management. RobecoSAM analysts decide from here whether the company will be excluded from the DJSI. An assurance report is completed by Deloitte to ensure the validity of the company's information.

In early 2009, an independent expert study commissioned by the United Nations Environment Programme Finance Initiative (UNEP FI) and presented at the World Economic Forum in Davos, highlighted the SAM assessment as "the most rigorous in terms of the number of questions and depth of information requested".

In 2009, SAM carried out its 11th-consecutive Corporate Sustainability Assessment, assessing more than 1,200 companies, an increase of eight percent from 2008. At the onset of DJSI's assessment criteria, SAM mainly focused on government compliance and regulations. It has evolved to embrace corporate sustainability as a key competitive advantage, taking into account nine specific criteria in addition to industry-specific criteria. Below are the criteria and weightings SAM uses to assess a company's overall score.

These weightings are approximations, and actual weightings may differ between industries. A breakdown of these dimensions is seen below.

Number of invited companies in 2010:

 Total Number Invited Companies = 2,617
 DJSI World Universe = 2,500
 DJSI Europe Universe = 600
 DJSI North America Universe = 600
 DJSI Asia Pacific = 600
 DJSI Korea = 200
 Companies analyzed globally = 1,393
 Companies completing questionnaire = 698
 Companies analyzed based exclusively on public information = 695

Some of the assessment criteria have varied slightly from year to year to reflect growing information about particular issues such as water related risks, brand management, corporate citizenship, risk and crisis management. Continuous improvement allows for SAM to provide both relevant and current information.

Since 1999, SAM's Corporate Sustainability Assessment has increased in number of assessed companies, number of sectors, number of questions to companies, average totally sustainability score, and weight of sector-specific criteria in percentage total weight.

Included in the most recent SAM questionnaire are more difficult to measure intangible business attributes such as innovation and customer relationship management. Questions are both directed at short-term risks and opportunities and sustainable long-term value creation.  The intensity of the industry-specific criteria has continuously increased. In 1999, industry-specific information accounted for only 30 percent of the overall score, while now it accounts for nearly 60 percent.

From these questionnaires, each company can be awarded one or a combination of the following status:

 Sector Leader: In each sector, the SAM Sector Leader is identified as the company best prepared to seize the opportunities and manage the risks deriving from economic, environmental and social developments. The SAM Sector Leader is the company with the best score of all companies assessed in this sector.
 Sector Mover: Sector Mover is awarded to the company that achieved the biggest proportional improvement in its sustainability performance compared with last year.
 SAM Gold Class: To qualify for the SAM Gold Class, the SAM Sector Leader must achieve a minimum total score of 75 percent. Peer-group companies whose total score is within five percent of the SAM Sector Leader are also awarded. SAM Gold Class. A score up to ten percent lower than the leader results in SAM Silver Class, a score up to 15 percent lower than the leader results in SAM Bronze Class.
 SAM Silver Class: To qualify for the SAM Silver Class, the SAM Sector Leader must achieve a total score in the range of 70 to 75 percent. Peer-group companies whose total score is within five to 10 percent of the SAM Sector Leader are also awarded SAM Silver Class, while a score of ten percent lower than the leader results in SAM Bronze Class.
 Sam Bronze Class: To qualify for the SAM Bronze Class, the SAM Sector Leader must achieve a total score in the range of 65 to 70 percent. Peer-group companies whose total score is within 10 to 15 percent of the SAM Sector Leader are also awarded SAM Bronze Class.

Reviews
The November 2010 DJSI Review includes a review of: key facts (showcasing recent news and growth in asset management), 2010 assessment, Dow Jones Sustainability World Index, Dow Jones Sustainability Europe Index, Dow Jones Sustainability Asia Pacific Index, Dow Jones Sustainability North America Index, Dow Jones Sustainability Korea Index, and Adjustments to Sustainability Index 2010.

Each index on the review includes an Index Range, Dow Jones Global Stock Market Index, selection of companies (percent of companies per sector, percent of market-capitalization coverage), the number of companies added and deleted from the DJSI, and component selection (based on industry). All changes will take effect at the close of trading on December 17, 2010.

Criticism

SAM uses four sources of information to assess corporate sustainability: company questionnaire (the Corporate Sustainability Assessment), company documentation, Media and Stakeholder Analysis, and contact with companies.

Using self-reported data as proxies for the social or environmental effects the DJSI intends to reflect leaves the index exposed to corporate biases and additional credibility risks. It rewards companies with greatest capacity to respond to SAM's questionnaires and information requests rather than those with the best socially responsible practices. Secondly, relying on self-reported data carries substantial risks since information from companies may not be completely credible. An index based on biased information often underestimates real risk factors in the listed companies' operation, even in those instances when submitted information if verified by an auditing firm such as PricewaterhouseCoopers, KPMG, etc. Ultimately, companies with challenging corporate environmental and social issues are more likely to devote public relations resources to minimize the perception of risk within their operations. In order to address some of this feedback, RobecoSAM added a Media and Stakeholder Analysis component to the annual Corporate Sustainability Assessment, in order to complement and help corroborate the questionnaire and documentation provided by the participating companies. For the MSA, RobecoSAM works with RepRisk, a global research firm specialized in risk analytics and metrics related to environmental, social and governance (ESG) issues. RepRisk screens media outlets, stakeholder groups and other publicly available sources to identify risks, which are then systematically analyzed and quantified.

It has been also found that in the DJSI the three dimensions of sustainability are not considered in a balanced way, being biased towards economic criteria to the disadvantage of social and environmental ones. A further bias of the DJSI is that it only includes large companies, whereas other indices include smaller companies as well. As a consequence of these limitations, a survey conducted among sustainability experts found that only 48 percent considered the DJSI as "highly trusted".

Relevance of the DJSI

Studies on the DJSI
Hope, Chris; Fowler, Stephen J. (2007).  "A Critical Review of Sustainable Business Indices and Their Impact". Journal of Business Ethics. Vol. 76. S. 243–252. 
Lee, D. D., & Faff, R. W. (2009). Corporate Sustainability Performance and Idiosyncratic Risk: A Global Perspective. Financial Review, 44(2), 213–237. doi:10.1111/j.1540-6288.2009.00216.x
A.K. Chatterji, R. Durand, D.I. Levine, and S. Touboul. Do ratings of firms converge? Implications for managers, investors and strategy researchers. Strategic Management Journal, 37(8): 1597–1614, August 2016. 
W.C. Carlos and B.W. Lewis. Strategic silence: Withholding certification status as a hypocrisy avoidance tactic. Administrative Science Quarterly, February 2017.

See also

Sustainability measurement
Socially responsible investing

References

External links
 
 RobecoSAM:DJSI Index Family

1999 introductions

S&P Dow Jones Indices
Ethical investment stock market indices